Vaidei may refer to several places in Romania:

 Vaidei, a village in Stănești Commune, Gorj County
 Vaidei, a village in Romos Commune, Hunedoara County
 Vaidei (river), a tributary of the Mureș in Hunedoara County